Atlético Infop was a Honduran football club based in Choloma, Honduras.

History
The club was defeated by Atlético Gualala in the Liga Mayor de Honduras promotion playoff and missed the right to be promoted to Liga de Ascenso de Honduras.

Atlético Choloma
The club was renamed Atlético Choloma in 2008.

References

Defunct football clubs in Honduras
Association football clubs disestablished in 2008
2008 disestablishments in Honduras